Högt i det blå is the second studio album by Swedish dansband Grönwalls. It was released on 7 October 1993.

Track listing
Mr Blue Eye
Gabriella
En calypso om kärleken
Vi två har varandra (The Two Step is Easy)
Mina röda skor
Åh Marie
Låt mig komma hem igen
Se på mig
Högt i det blå
Det är min dröm
I'm a Believer
Ett liv i en drömvärld (Domani, Domani)
Varje litet ögonkast (Every Little Thing)
Lyckan som du ger
Årets sång

References 

1993 albums
Grönwalls albums
Swedish-language albums